Ware may refer to:

People 

 Ware (surname)
 William of Ware, English Franciscan theologian

Places

Canada
Fort Ware, British Columbia

United Kingdom
Ware, Devon
Ware, Hertfordshire
Ware, Kent

United States
Ware, Elmore County, Alabama, See List of places in Alabama: S–Z#W
Ware, Jefferson County, Alabama, See List of places in Alabama: S–Z#W
Ware, Arkansas, see List of places in Arkansas: W
Ware, Illinois
Ware, Iowa
Ware, Kentucky
Ware, Massachusetts, a New England town
Ware (CDP), Massachusetts, the primary village in the town
Ware, Missouri
Ware, Texas, see List of United States tornadoes in May 2010#May 18 event
Ware County, Georgia

Other uses 
 Pottery
 WARE, an AM radio station licensed to Ware, Massachusetts
 Ware people, an ethnic group in Tanzania
 Wares (musical group), a Canadian music group
 Ware Group, a covert American communist organization
 Ware F.C., a Hertfordshire-based football team
 Ware Opening, an uncommon chess opening
 Ware, an antiquated word for a product (business)
 Wares, collective noun for commodity

See also
 Hardware (disambiguation)
 Silverware (disambiguation)
 Software
 Warez, slang for illegally obtained software
 Wear (disambiguation)